Seven Years of Happiness (Italian: Sette anni di felicità) is a 1943 Italian "white-telephones" comedy film directed by Ernst Marischka and Roberto Savarese and starring Vivi Gioi, Wolf Albach-Retty and Hans Moser.

The film's sets were designed by the art director Piero Filippone. It was shot at the Cinecittà Studios in Rome. It was co-produced with the German firm Bavaria Film, and a separate German version Seven Years of Good Luck was also made.

Cast
 Vivi Gioi as Ella Jüttner  
 Wolf Albach-Retty as Kersten  
 Hans Moser as Augusto Daisinger  
 Theo Lingen as Gribling, il cameriere  
 Elli Parvo as Melitta, la cameriera  
 Carlo Romano as José, l'allevatore di tori  
 Paolo Stoppa as Il bandito balbuziente  
 Rio Nobile as L'agente di polizia  
 Silvio Bagolini as Febo  
 Primo Carnera as Un poliziotto 
 Liana Del Balzo as La cantante sul camion  
 Antonio Mancuso as Il bandito che ruba i soldi

References

Bibliography 
 Bock, Hans-Michael & Bergfelder, Tim. The Concise CineGraph. Encyclopedia of German Cinema. Berghahn Books, 2009.
 Lancia, Enrico & Melelli, Fabio. Attori stranieri del nostro cinema. Gremese Editore, 2006.

External links 
 
 Seven Years of Happiness at Variety Distribution

1943 films
1940s multilingual films
Italian comedy films
1943 comedy films
1940s Italian-language films
Films directed by Ernst Marischka
Films directed by Roberto Savarese
Italian multilingual films
Films shot at Cinecittà Studios
Italian black-and-white films
1940s Italian films